Freedows is:

 a Brazilian Linux distribution; see Freedows Linux
 a suspended project for creating a free operating system; see Freedows OS